The Commonweal School is a secondary school (with a sixth form) in the south-west of Swindon, Wiltshire, England.

History
The Commonweal School was opened in 1927, and most of the first pupils transferred from the College and Euclid Street secondary schools.  The original building was designed for 410 pupils. September 1939 saw a sudden rise in numbers to 530 as evacuees arrived, half of them from East Ham Grammar School, London.

In 1965, it became a Senior High School, taking pupils of all abilities aged 14 to 18. There was another re-organisation in 1983 when Commonweal became a seven-form entry comprehensive school for pupils aged 11 to 16, therefore losing its sixth form.

Its academy status was awarded on 1 August 2011; previously, it had been a foundation school. An expansion in September 2014 saw the reinstatement of its sixth form, known as C6.

Leadership
'Tam' Hartley was the first headmaster.  Doctor C.E Jones was appointed headmaster in 1932, and his name is commemorated in the shield awarded to the house that wins the annual Sports Day. Robert 'Bob' Linnegar took over in September 2017 and retired at the end of August 2021. Mr Charles 'Chas' Drew taking the post at the start of the 2021/2022 Academic year.

School houses
There are four school houses, each named after a historical site within Wiltshire. Each house has its own colour, head and deputy.
 Ridgeway 
 Sarum
 Stonehenge
 Whitehorse
Upon arrival at the school, each student is placed within a house. Houses act as a 'community' for the students, and students compete in inter-house events throughout the year. The house with the most points will be awarded the inter-house shield. Whilst in their final year at Commonweal, students are able to apply to become house officials, otherwise known as prefects.

Sixth form
In December 2012, it was announced by the Head that the Department for Education had accepted the school's bid for a sixth form. This opened in September 2014 with places for up to 300 students in new, purpose-built facilities, funded by the Department for Education. The sixth form provides a range of academic courses, alongside a varied enrichment programme.

Academic performance
At the most recent Ofsted inspection, in November 2017, the school received a rating of 'Good' in all categories, leading to an overall effectiveness rating of 'Good'.

In a Kirkland Rowell survey of students in September 2016, 57% of students gave an overall satisfaction rating of 'Good' and 23% 'Very good'. This means about 20% of students – around 230 of the returned surveys – did not think of the school as good.

Alumni
 Keith Browning, atmospheric scientist
 Justin Hayward, musician
 Lyndon Ogbourne, actor

References

External links
 

Academies in Swindon
1927 establishments in England
Educational institutions established in 1927
Secondary schools in Swindon